Kemsit was an ancient Egyptian queen consort, the wife of pharaoh Mentuhotep II of the 11th Dynasty. Her tomb (TT308) and small decorated chapel were found in her husband's Deir el-Bahari temple complex, behind the main building, along with the tombs of five other ladies, Ashayet, Henhenet, Kawit, Sadeh and Mayet. Most of them were priestesses of Hathor, so it is possible that they were buried there as part of the goddess's cult, but it is also possible that they were the daughters of nobles the king wanted to keep an eye upon.

Only parts of her sarcophagus have been found, these are now in the Egyptian Museum in Cairo.

The queen was also depicted on reliefs in the funerary temple of her husband Mentuhotep II. These depictions are today heavily destroyed, but it seems that she appeared in a scene showing a row of royal women. On the preserved fragments she is shown behind queen Kawit. Her title in the depiction is King's Beloved Wife.

Her titles were: King's Beloved Wife (ḥmt-nỉswt mrỉỉ.t=f ), King's Ornament (ẖkr.t-nỉswt), King's Sole Ornament (ẖkr.t-nỉswt wˁtỉ.t), Priestess of Hathor (ḥm.t-nṯr ḥwt-ḥrw).

Sources

21st-century BC Egyptian people
21st-century BC women
Queens consort of the Eleventh Dynasty of Egypt
Egyptian people of Nubian descent
Mentuhotep II
Ancient Egyptian priestesses
Hathor